Moving Mountains may refer to:

Music
 Moving Mountains (band), an American indie rock and post-rock band
 Moving Mountains (Justin Hayward album), 1985
 Moving Mountains (The Casket Lottery album), 2000
 Moving Mountains (Moving Mountains album), 2013
 Moving Mountains (EP), a 2006 EP by Moving Mountains
 "Moving Mountains" (song), a song by American R&B singer Usher

See also
 Moving the Mountain (disambiguation)